The NRF Foundation is a 501(c)(3) nonprofit and the philanthropic arm of the National Retail Federation.

Leadership 
Ellen Davis was named president of the NRF Foundation in 2018. She joined the NRF in 2002 as manager of media relations and held several positions within the communications and public affairs department before becoming executive director of the Foundation in 2012. She then left NRF for CBA in January 2020.

Macy’s Inc. Chairman and CEO Jeff Gennette is chairman of the NRF Foundation Board, a position previously held by former Neiman Marcus President and CEO Karen Katz.

NRF Foundation Gala 
The NRF Foundation brings together hundreds of retail executives and industry supporters for its annual Gala in New York City every January. The Gala raises money for the Foundation’s initiatives, including scholarships and educational programming and its training and credential program, RISE Up. The 25 individuals named to The List of People Shaping Retail’s Future, as well as the recipient of NRF’s The Visionary, are also recognized at the Gala.>

The 5th annual NRF Foundation Gala raised $3.2 million and took place on January 13 at the Sheraton New York Times Square Hotel in New York City.

Student Program at Retail’s Big Show 
Each year leading up to Retail’s Big Show, the NRF Foundation hosts its Student Program for hundreds of students in New York City. This program exposes students to career paths in retail through talks from retail CEOs, networking and mentoring opportunities. Recipients are also selected at this time for several of the Foundation’s scholarship programs.

RISE Up 
In 2017, the NRF Foundation brought together dozens of retailers and nonprofits to launch the RISE Up (Retail Industry Skills and Education) training and credential program, designed to help people acquire the skills they need to land jobs in retail and advance into careers. Since its launch, more than 50,000 individuals have participated in RISE Up.

References 

Foundations based in the United States
501(c)(3) organizations
Philanthropic organizations based in the United States